Warszawice  (local name Warszewice) is a village in Gmina Sobienie-Jeziory, Otwock County, Masovian Voivodeship, Poland. The village covers an area of 5 km². The  population was near 330. In the village is Voivodship Road 805, school and church. From 1975 to 1998 village was in Siedlce Voivodeship.

Villages nearby

Radwanków Szlachecki, Warszówka, Całowanie, Dziecinów.

Villages in Otwock County
Masovia
Masovian Voivodeship (1526–1795)
Siedlce Governorate
Lublin Governorate
Lublin Voivodeship (1919–1939)
Warsaw Voivodeship (1919–1939)